Events from the year 1540 in Sweden

Incumbents
 Monarch – Gustav I

Events

 4 January - Prince Erik is officially greeted as heir to the throne by nobility and bishops in Örebro. 
 January - The reformers Olaus Petri and Laurentius Andreae are sentenced to treason but pardoned.
 - The first Evangelic mass is held in Vadstena Abbey.
 - Georg Norman inspects the churches in Västergötland and Östergötland, confiscates superfluous church valuables and registers dissident priests.

Births

 November - Princess Cecilia of Sweden, princess  (died 1627) 
 - Abraham Angermannus, archbishop  (died 1607)

Deaths

References

External links

 
Years of the 16th century in Sweden
Sweden